General Somerset may refer to:

Edward Arthur Somerset (1817–1886), British Army lieutenant general
FitzRoy Somerset, 1st Baron Raglan (1788–1855), British Army general
Henry Somerset (British Army officer) (1794–1862), British Army lieutenant general
Lord Robert Somerset (1776–1842), British Army general